Jack Frost is the character from English folklore who personifies winter.

Jack Frost may also refer to:

People
 Jack Frost (footballer, born 1870) (1870–1935), Australian footballer
 Jack Frost (footballer, born 1920) (1920–1988), English professional footballer
 Jack Frost (footballer, born 1992), Australian footballer
 Jack Frost (musician) (born 1968), American musician
 Jack Frost (politician) (1911–1995), Australian politician
 John Frost (SAAF officer) (1918–1942), South African fighter ace
 John Carver Meadows Frost (1915–1979), aka Jack Frost, British aircraft designer for Avro Canada
 John W. Frost (born 1934), American academic and former tennis player
 Jack Frost, pseudonym of Bob Dylan (born 1941) as producer starting in the 1990s

Bands
 Jack Frost (Australian band), Australian rock band
 Jack Frost (Austrian band), Austrian gothic band

Arts and entertainment
 Jack Frost (1934 film), an animated short film produced by Ub Iwerks
 Jack Frost (1964 film), Russian film
 Jack Frost (TV special), a 1979 Rankin-Bass television special
 Jack Frost (1997 film), a 1997 horror film
 Jack Frost 2: Revenge of the Mutant Killer Snowman, the 2000 sequel to the above horror film
 Jack Frost (1998 film), a 1998 family film starring Michael Keaton
 Jack Frost (manhwa), a 2009 manhwa series by Go Jin Ho
 Jack Frost, an album from Australian band Jack Frost

Fictional characters
 Jack Frost (comics)
 Jack Frost (Marvel Comics), pair of characters
 Jack Frost, a character in the Vertigo Comics series The Invisibles
 Jack Frost (Fables), a character in Jack of Fables
 Jack Frost, an Avon Comics character based on the folkloric figure
 Jack Frost (detective), central character in radio plays and novels by R.D. Wingfield and TV series A Touch of Frost
 Jack Frost (mascot), the unofficial mascot of Atlus, a Japanese computer and video game company
 Jack Frost, a minor character in the StarCraft expansion Insurrection
 Jack Frost, a character played by Martin Short in The Santa Clause 3: The Escape Clause
 Jack Frost, a character from the film Rise of the Guardians and the William Joyce book series on which it was based
 Jack Frost, the antagonist in Neil Gaiman's The Graveyard Book
Jack Frost, antagonist of the Rainbow Magic book series

Other uses
 Jack Frost Ski Resort, in the Poconos region of Pennsylvania, United States

See also
 Frost (surname)
 John Frost (disambiguation)